Ebeid is an Arabic surname. Its spelling in Roman characters as such is most commonly a transliteration of the Levantine or Egyptian Arabic pronunciation of the name Ubayd, spelt identically in Arabic. Other transliterations and pronunciations of the name include Obeid. 

Ebeid may refer to:

People
 Anis Ebeid (1909–1988), Egyptian translator, translator of many Hollywood films into Arabic
 Atef Ebeid (1932–2014), former prime minister of Egypt
 Makram Ebeid (1879–1961), Egyptian politician
 Mona Makram-Ebeid (born 1943), Egyptian politician
 Nabila Ebeid (born 1945), Egyptian actress
 Nadia Makram Ebeid, Egyptian academic
 Nary Ebeid (born 1979/1980), American contestant on The Amazing Race 20

Others
Ebeid Cabinet, government of Egypt that was led by Egyptian prime minister Atef Ebeid 1999–2004

See also
 Al-Ubaid (disambiguation), for other uses and various romanizations of the same name
 Ubaydul Haq (disambiguation) and variants

Arabic-language surnames